Lufeng may refer to：

 Lufeng, Guangdong (陆丰市), county-level city of Shanwei, Guangdong
 Lufeng, Xupu (卢峰镇),  a town of Xupu County, Hunan
 Lufeng, Yunnan (禄丰市), county-level city of Chuxiong Prefecture, Yunnan
 Lufeng dialect (陆丰话), or Haifeng dialect, mostly spoken in Shanwei, Haifeng and Lufeng, Guangdong

See also
Lufang Township (disambiguation)